Segh (also known as Seq) is a village in Siyahu Rural District, Fin District, Bandar Abbas County, Hormozgan Province, Iran. At the 2006 census, its population was 513, in 135 families.

References 

Populated places in Bandar Abbas County